Gim Daejung may refer to:

Kim Dae-jung (1924–2009), South Korean president from 1998 to 2003
Kim Dea-jung (born 1970), South Korean sledge hockey player
Kim Dae-joong (footballer) (born 1992), South Korean footballer

See also
Kim Daejung Convention Center station